Spyglass Media Group, LLC, formerly Spyglass Entertainment, is an American film production company founded by Gary Barber and Roger Birnbaum in 1998.

History

Spyglass Entertainment 
On August 21, 1998, Gary Barber, former vice chairman and COO of Morgan Creek Productions, together with Roger Birnbaum, co-founder and former head of Caravan Pictures, founded Spyglass Entertainment. The startup company signed a five-year distribution agreement with Disney, which took an equity stake. Birnbaum previously left Caravan at the prompting of then Disney studio chief Joe Roth; with Disney cutting its yearly production output, Roth recommended forming a self-financing production firm similar to New Regency Productions. After Caravan's remaining three films were released, Caravan went inactive. Its slate of film projects and an initial financial advance of $10 million to $20 million against future overages were also contributed by Disney. Spyglass's operations were formed and based at the Walt Disney Studios. On October 29, 1998, European media conglomerates Kirch Group and Mediaset invested in theatrical, video and television distribution rights to between 15 and 25 films in Germany, Italy, Spain, Poland and the former Soviet Union for over five years. M. Night Shyamalan's The Sixth Sense (released 1999) was Spyglass's first film, collecting $661 million at the box office worldwide.

By May 23, 2000, Disney took a 10% equity stake in Spyglass, along with Svensk Filmindustri of Scandinavia and Lusomundo of Portugal. On March 7, 2003, Spyglass Entertainment agreed to a four-year distribution output deal with Village Roadshow for Australia, New Zealand and Greece.

On August 6, 2002, Spyglass Entertainment launched a television division, and it was focused on small screen projects. One of its projects was the short-lived series Miracles.

That same year, it attempted to merge with smaller independent distributor Intermedia, but it failed.

In December 2003, Spyglass ended its deal with Disney and agreed to a four-year first-look non-exclusive co-financing and production deal with DreamWorks. This deal was never finalized and the relationship was not working well. Thus on September 23, 2003, Spyglass instead made a similar deal with Sony Pictures. Spyglass did not move to the Sony lot, but to Murdoch Plaza in Westwood, Los Angeles.

By March 25, 2010, Spyglass was acquired by Cerberus Capital Management.

On December 20, 2010, Gary Barber and Roger Birnbaum became co-chairmen and CEOs of the holding company of Metro-Goldwyn-Mayer (MGM), which had at that time recently emerged from bankruptcy. The original plan had the Spyglass library being added to MGM, but it was later removed from the plan.

Spyglass Media Group 
On March 13, 2019, Barber and Lantern Entertainment revived the company as Spyglass Media Group, bringing in Eagle Pictures and Cineworld as investors. Lantern made a majority investment and also transferred its film library and rights to Miramax film sequels to the Spyglass. Barber owns the Spyglass trademark and the sequel and remake rights to the old Spyglass library, which he has contributed. The company plans to produce content for all platforms. Spyglass closed the former Lantern Entertainment/TWC office in New York City while laying off 15 staff members across divisions.

On April 1, 2019, Lauren Whitney, the president of television for Miramax, took on the same position for Spyglass. Damien Marin followed Barber from MGM to be appointed Spyglass president of worldwide distribution and acquisitions on September 3, 2019.

On April 16, 2019, Warner Bros. bought an equity stake in Spyglass, which signed a first-look deal with the studio. Spyglass was involved on August 1, 2019 in a potential purchase of part of Miramax but dropped out in two weeks.

Spyglass's first greenlit film since its revival is a revival of the Hellraiser franchise announced on May 6, 2019. With the company winning the rights to Stephen King's The Institute book in November 2019, Jack Bender and David E. Kelley were paired to development and produce the book as a mini-series. Also, Bender was signed by Spyglass to a television first-look deal.

MGM President of Physical Production Peter Oillataguerre was appointed President of Production for Spyglass Media Group reporting to Barber.

On July 15, 2021, Lionsgate acquired most of The Weinstein Company's film library, which until then had been owned by Spyglass, with Lionsgate getting a 20% equity stake in Spyglass and Spyglass getting a first look TV deal with Lionsgate Television.

Foreign distributors 
 Village Roadshow: Australia, New Zealand and Greece (2003–2007)
 Canal+: France, Benelux, Sweden and Poland pay TV 
 Sogecable: Spanish pay cable
 Pony Canyon: Japan
 Lusomundo: Portugal
 Forum: Israel
 Ster-Kinekor: South Africa
 Diamond Films: Argentina
 Paris Filmes: Brazil

Production filmography

As Spyglass Entertainment

1990s

2000s

2010s

As Spyglass Media Group

2020s

In development

References

External links 
 

 
American companies established in 1998
Mass media companies established in 1998
1998 establishments in California
American companies disestablished in 2012
Mass media companies disestablished in 2012
2012 disestablishments in California
American companies established in 2019
Mass media companies established in 2019
2010 mergers and acquisitions
2019 establishments in California
Film production companies of the United States
Entertainment companies based in California
Companies based in Los Angeles
Warner Bros.
Lantern Entertainment
Lionsgate subsidiaries
Re-established companies
American independent film studios